St John of God Hospital Burwood is a private psychiatric hospital which provides mental health care on an inpatient, day patient and outpatient basis.

The hospital is located in Sydney's inner-west. In addition to the main building, the hospital operates specialised medical consulting rooms at the adjacent Medical Centre, as well as a Counselling and Therapy Centre located in the hospital grounds.

St John of God Burwood Hospital is a division of St John of God Health Care, a Catholic not-for-profit health care group, serving communities with hospitals, home nursing, and social outreach services throughout Australia, New Zealand and the wider Asia-Pacific region.

Facilities 
St John of God Burwood Hospital has one ECT suite and one TMS interventional laboratory. It also has the only specialist inpatient mother and baby unit in New South Wales.

Research
In 2009, the Perinatal and Women's Mental Health Unit was established through a partnership with St John of God Health Care and the University of New South Wales.

Based at the Burwood hospital and led by Professor Marie-Paule Austin, the unit is the first of its kind in Australia to combine both pre-natal and women's mental health.

Professor Austin and her team will conduct research into anxiety, depression, bipolar disorder and other emotional health issues experienced by mothers during pregnancy and after birth.

See also
List of hospitals in Australia

References

Hospital buildings completed in 1958
Hospitals in Sydney
Psychiatric hospitals in Australia
St John of God Health Care